Menavli is a village about three kilometres from Wai in the Satara district. The village's claim to fame is due to the palace (wada) built by Nana Fadnavis, 18th century Maratha statesman and the regent of Peshwa Madhavrao II.

Fadnavis Wada
The Nana Phadnavis Wada is a large six-quadrangular, perimeter-protected wada.

History
Bhavan Rao Trymbak Pant Pratinidhi of Aundh and Raghunath Ghanshyam Mantri (Satara) bestowed the village of Menavli to Nana Phadnavis in December 1768.

Nana Phadnavis settled the village and built his residence complex here. It had a Wada (A mansion with an inner courtyard), a Ghat (steps) leading from the mansion to the Krishna river and two temples, one dedicated to Lord Vishnu and another to Meneshwar (मेणेश्वर) Lord Shiva.
The architectural combination of a Wada-type residence, a Ghat on a water-body and a Temple was typical of Peshwa era. This construction was completed around 1780. The Phadnavis wada is one of the very rare places where such a combination is preserved intact. Originally, simple stone steps descending into a river, ghats evolved into an elaborate arrangement of terraces with separate areas for different activities, such as bathing, washing, filling water and performing religious rites. Temples were traditionally built on ghats The Shiva temple on the ghat has a bell which was taken from a Portuguese church inside Vasai Fort  by Chimaji Appa, Maratha general and brother of Bajirao I when he captured the fort from the Portuguese in 1739.

Nana, being the Peshwas' record keeper transcribed and maintained their documents of accounts and administrative letters in the ancient "Modi" script. These documents, known as the famous "Menavli Daptar" were preserved in this Wada at Menavli.The Daptar documents are now preserved at Deccan College, Pune

After Nana's death in 1800, the Peshwa Bajirao II, confiscated the Wada. The British General Arthur Wellesley (the future Duke of Wellington) returned the property to the Nana's wife Jeeubai on 25 March 1804. After her death, Sir Bartle Frere (governor of Bombay) handed over the property to Nana's descendants.

The Wada and the surroundings today
The Nana Phadnavis Wada today remains with his descendants. Having split the major part of his properties between themselves, the Wada is still owned jointly by them all. Wadas are systems of open courtyards of increasing security. The wada here has six courtyards. Nana's corridors on the upper floor are lined with teak-wood lattice work. A concealed escape stairway in the wall leads out of the Wada. Descending the stone steps leads to the ghat on the river Krishna. On descending the steps. 
There is a dark musty, narrow, steep staircase concealed in the metre-thick wall to the floor above. The staircase was at once secret and easily secured, admitting only one person at a time into Nana Phadnavis's darbar hall.
The wada contains Murals that have been classified under Maratha painting. A mural here depicts Sita in Marathi saree., Some of the paintings depict Krishna with Gopis

The bell house of the Meneshwar temple houses a six hundred and fifty kilogram bell. This bell was captured by Peshwa Bajirao I’s brother, Chimaji Appa, from a cathedral in the Portuguese fort at Bassein. Dated 1707, the five-alloy bell bears a bas-relief of Mary carrying the infant Jesus Christ cast into it.

An ancient tree, with a massive coniform trunk has a platform constructed around it is as old as the Wada itself. This tree featured in the Bollywood movie Swades. In the movie, the village elders hold a Panchayat on the stone platform around this tree.

Movie location

Several Bollywood movies have been shot, using the wada as an exotic location, notably, Yudh (Jackie Shroff/Tina Munim), Mrityudand (Madhuri Dixit), Goonj Uthi Shehnai, Jis Desh Mein Ganga Rehta Hain (Govinda), Gangaajal (Ajay Devgan), Sarja (Ajinkya Deo), Bajirao Mastani and Swades (Shahrukh Khan, Gayatri Joshi). The film crew of the movie Swades, once camped at the ghat to shoot some footage. The crew cleaned and painted the old stone walls of the ghat and the temples.

References

Villages in Satara district
Maharashtra